Uprise Books Project is a non-profit organization in the United States that provides banned books to underprivileged teenagers.

It was founded in 2011.  It is based in Vancouver, Washington.

In November 2011, the organization raised USD $10,000 from a Kickstarter campaign.

In May 2013, the Uprise Books Project was selected as one of the National Book Foundation's Innovations in Reading Prize winners.

External links
 Official site

References

Book censorship in the United States
Non-profit organizations based in Washington (state)
Kickstarter projects